James Frederick Bancroft (August 5, 1855 – September 3, 1929) was a Canadian educator in Newfoundland.

References 

 

1855 births
1929 deaths
Canadian schoolteachers
People from Chester
British emigrants to Canada